Daniel Wardwell (May 28, 1791 – March 27, 1878) was an American lawyer, jurist, and politician who served three terms as a U.S. Representative from New York from 1831 to 1837,

Biography 
Born in Bristol, Rhode Island, Wardwell was graduated from Brown University, Providence, Rhode Island, in 1811.
He studied law.
He was admitted to the bar and commenced practice in Rome, New York.

He moved to Mannsville, New York, in 1814.
He served as judge of the court of common pleas for Jefferson County, New York.

Wardwell was a member of the New York State Assembly in 1826, 1827, 1828 and 1838.

Congress 
Wardwell was elected as a Jacksonian to the Twenty-second, Twenty-third, and Twenty-fourth Congresses (March 4, 1831 – March 3, 1837).
He served as chairman of the Committee on Revolutionary Pensions (Twenty-third and Twenty-fourth Congresses).

Later career and death 
He returned to Rome, New York, and resumed the practice of law.

He died in Rome, New York, March 27, 1878.
He was interred in Maplewood Cemetery, Mannsville, New York.

Sources

1791 births
1878 deaths
Brown University alumni
Politicians from Rome, New York
Jacksonian members of the United States House of Representatives from New York (state)
19th-century American politicians
Members of the United States House of Representatives from New York (state)